Michael Pressman is an American film and television producer and director.

Early life 
A native of Manhattan, Pressman was born into a theatrical family. His mother, Sasha, a modern dancer, was an original member of Martha Graham's renowned first dance troupe. His father, David Pressman, was a well-known theatrical and television director who helped launch Boston University’s distinguished school of theater and helmed Broadway plays, including The Disenchanted, Jason Robards' first Broadway appearance; and the original Actor’s Studio Anthology Series in the late 1940’s, for which he discovered and cast an unknown Grace Kelly. David Pressman’s pioneer career in live television in the early 1950’s was suddenly derailed when he was targeted by Senator Joseph McCarthy during his blacklisting of alleged communist sympathizers. Unable to work in television for close to 15 years, he survived the blacklist by teaching. When the Blacklist itself derailed in the early 1960’s, he began working regularly in television directing soap operas. He directed the popular One Life to Live for twenty-eight years, and for which he was nominated for a Primetime Emmy and ten Daytime Emmys, winning three times.

Career
Pressman’s interest in filmmaking was directly motivated, if not provoked, by his family’s persecution for their early political sympathies, not unlike others of his era, including those in entertainment and in sciences. It led him to pursue projects, when professionally and financially viable to do so, that were politically, socially and racially compatible with his personal perspectives.  

Of course, young filmmakers must make a living, and Pressman knew he needed to establish his bona fides first. His first feature film as a director was the raucous indie comedy The Great Texas Dynamite Chase, made in collaboration with producers and fellow film school students Sean Daniel and David Kirkpatrick, both who went on to forge successful producing careers of their own. With that modest success, Pressman was categorized as a comedy director, and was offered films like the Bad News Bears in Breaking Training, the sequel to the immensely popular original starring Walter Matthau, the Dan Aykroyd comedy Doctor Detroit, and Teenage Mutant Ninja Turtles II: The Secret of the Ooze. These films, though successful, represented but one side of his ambition and talent.

Pressman was able to break this cycle the studios had seemingly mapped out for him, and very early in his career directed the ground-breaking dramatic cult hit Boulevard Nights, the first Latino gang movie of the era which was recently selected for preservation by the Library of Congress. He followed that with Those Lips, Those Eyes, a love letter to the theater about the life of the actor in summer stock, with a lead star-making performance by Frank Langella.

With these successes behind him, Pressman chose to follow up not with another feature, which he had been offered, but with a 1985 short film entitled And The Children Shall Lead, which, for its time, was a racially progressive story starring Danny Glover, Beah Richards and LeVar Burton. He was next courted to direct a resurgent Richard Pryor in post Vietnam War drama, Some Kind of Hero, co-starring the then top box office grossing actress Margot Kidder. However, the studio had other ideas about the film being a drama, not to mention its explicit love scene between the interracial leads, and took the film away from the filmmakers and recut it. It was a lesson Pressman learned the hard way: studios at that time were not interested in taking any kind of progressive posture with its movie stars.

It was time for a change. Television at that time was offering young directors a variety of dramatic content, and Pressman gravitated to directing more than a dozen films for television in quick succession during that medium’s heyday. His most successful television movie was To Heal a Nation, about the building of the Vietnam memorial starring Eric Roberts. He also directed the famed Anne Tyler novel Saint Maybe, starring a young Tom McCarthy, Blythe Danner and Mary-Louise Parker for Hallmark Hall of Fame. His notoriety as a top director of dramatic content earned him an offer from David Kelley to co-executive produce and direct a much-anticipated new TV series called Picket Fences, which lasted four seasons and won him two Emmy Awards for Outstanding Drama Series. He next went on to launch Kelley’s next show, Chicago Hope, which earned him another Emmy nomination for Outstanding Drama Series.

Since then, Pressman has produced and directed numerous network series, including multiple episodes of the Emmy Award-winning series Law & Order SVU, and two seasons of the then new series Blue Bloods. Pressman also directed the final two hours of the Emmy-nominated TV mini-series Law & Order True Crime: The Menendez Murders, starring Edie Falco and Heather Graham. Most recently, Pressman executive produced the fifth and sixth season of NBC’s Chicago Med. He left the series after the first year of the pandemic.

Pressman’s stage work includes directing the Los Angeles premiere of To Gillian on her 37th Birthday, which he then directed as a feature film starring Claire Danes, Michelle Pfeiffer, and Peter Gallagher and a Los Angeles equity waiver production of Frankie and Johnny in the Claire De Lune, which he also later adapted into the independent film Frankie and Johnny are Married. He also directed the 2008 Broadway revival of Come Back, Little Sheba, for which he cast the indomitable S. Epatha Merkerson, in the role of the lead character Lola, which had previously been played by only white actresses, and depicted an interracial relationship on stage. Merkerson went on to be Tony nominated for her performance in this role, which the New York Times called, “a performance that stops the heart.” Pressman won Best Director that year by the NAACP Artist Awards.

In between series projects, Pressman also directed the play Finks in Los Angeles. It was a very personal story for him as it is about the blacklisting of comic actor Jack Gilford during the McCarthy witch-hunt. Joe Gilford, the author of the play, was a childhood friend and they were able to share and embrace their pasts as children of the Blacklist and how it affected both of their creative lives.

Awards and nominations 
Pressman won two Emmys for executive producing and show running the series Picket Fences. He earned an Emmy nomination and a DGA nomination for his work on the hospital drama Chicago Hope.

Personal life 
Pressman recently married Maia Danziger, an Emmy Winning actress of television and Broadway theater and feature films, and is also a creator of Relax and Write, a meditative writing program that she teaches around the world. They knew each other as children, having grown up in the same building on the upper west side of Manhattan. They recently re-connected six years ago, and married four years ago.

References

External links 

1950 births
Living people
Film producers from New York (state)
American television directors
Television producers from New York City
California Institute of the Arts alumni
Camp Rising Sun alumni
Film directors from New York City
The High School of Music & Art alumni